Eric Christiansen (15 September 1937 – 31 October 2016) was a medieval historian and fellow emeritus of New College, Oxford University.

Christiansen was educated at Charterhouse School after which he served in the ranks of the Northamptonshire Regiment. He became a fellow of New College after completing a thesis on modern Spanish history but subsequently specialised in medieval history.

Selected publications
 The origins of military power in Spain, 1800-1854. Oxford University Press, Oxford, 1967. (Oxford Historical Monographs)
 The Northern Crusades, the Baltic and the Catholic Frontier, 1100-1525. Macmillan, 1980. (New Studies in Medieval History) 
 The Works of Sven Aggesen: Twelfth-century Danish Historian. Viking Society for Northern Research, 1992. 
 Dudo of St Quentin: History of the Normans. Translation with introduction and notes. Boydell Press, 1998. 
 The Norsemen in the Viking Age. Wiley Blackwell, 2002. (The Peoples of Europe)

References

1937 births
2016 deaths
British medievalists
Fellows of New College, Oxford
English people of Danish descent
People educated at Charterhouse School
Northamptonshire Regiment soldiers
Alumni of New College, Oxford